Juliet Berto (16 January 1947 – 10 January 1990), born Annie Jamet, was a French actress, director and screenwriter.

A member of the same loose group of student radicals as Anne Wiazemsky, she first appeared in Jean-Luc Godard's Two or Three Things I Know About Her, and would go on to appear in many of Godard's subsequent films, including La Chinoise, Week End, Le Gai Savoir, and Vladimir et Rosa. She later became a muse for the French New Wave director Jacques Rivette, starring in Out 1 and Celine and Julie Go Boating.

In the 1980s she became a screenwriter and film director. Her film Cap Canaille (1983) was entered into the 33rd Berlin International Film Festival. In 1987, she was a member of the jury at the 37th Berlin International Film Festival. She died of breast cancer six days before her 43rd birthday.

Partial filmography 

 2 or 3 Things I Know About Her (1967) - Girl talking to Robert
 La Chinoise (1967) - Yvonne
 Weekend (1967) - Une activiste du FLSO / La jeune bourgeoise accidentée (uncredited)
 Wheel of Ashes (1968) - Girl Playing Pinball 1
 Ciné-girl (1969) - Régine
 Détruisez-vous (1969)
 Joy of Learning (1969) - Patricia Lumumba
 Slogan (1969) - L'assistante de Serge / Secretary
 Je, tu, elles... (1969) - La femme qui achète les hommes sur catalogue
 Camarades (1970) - Juliette
 L'escadron Volapük (1970) - Marguerite, la serveuse
 Un été sauvage (1970) - Sylvie
 L'araignée d'eau (1970)
 Vladimir and Rosa (1971) - Juliet / Weatherwoman / Hippie (uncredited)
  (1971) - Annick Damien
 La cavale (1971) - Annick Damien
 Out 1 (1971) - Frederique
 Sex-shop (1972) - Isabelle
 Les caïds (1972) - Célia Murelli
 Out 1: Spectre (1972) - Frederique
 Les petits enfants d'Attila (1972) - La religieuse (uncredited)
 Le retour d'Afrique (1973) - Juliet
 Défense de savoir (1973) - Juliette Cristiani
 Erica Minor (1974) - Claude
 Le protecteur (1974) - Nathalie Malakian
 Summer Run (1974)
 Celine and Julie Go Boating (1974) - Celine
 The Middle of the World (1974) - Juliette
 Le mâle du siècle (1975) - Isabelle
 Claro (1975)
 Mr. Klein (1976) - Jeanine
 Duelle (1976) - Leni
 The Moving Picture Man (1977)
 L'Argent des Autres (1978) - Arlette Rivière
 Roberte (1979) - Petit F
 Bastien Bastienne (1979) - Catherine
 Destins parallèles (1979)
 Guns (1980) - Margot
 Neige (1981) - Anita
 Conversa Acabada (1981) - Helena
 Cap Canaille (1983) - Paula Baretto
 Family Life (1985) - Mara
 Adolescente, sucre d'amour (1985) - Juliette
 Un amour à Paris (1987) - Mona
 Hôtel du Paradis (1987) - Prostitute
 Papillon du vertige (1987) - Clarisse

References

External links
 
 Juliet Berto's Cinématon - A 4 minutes online portrait of the actress by Gérard Courant

1947 births
1990 deaths
20th-century French actresses
20th-century French screenwriters
20th-century French women writers
Actresses from Grenoble
Deaths from cancer in France
French film actresses
French film directors
French women film directors
French women screenwriters